Sandy Bay First Ojibway Nation (Ojibwe: Gaa-wiikwedaawangaag) is an Ojibway/Dakota/mixed-blood First Nation in Manitoba, Canada. As of the 2016 Canadian Census, it had a population of 2,515; while the First Nation's website reported a membership of 6,776 individuals as of April 2018.

It is located on the western shore of Lake Manitoba. Adjacent rural municipalities are Alonsa and Gladstone Lakeview.

Early history

Sandy Bay's original roots began after the signing of Treaty 1, in 1870 in Portage la Prairie, Manitoba.
 
In 1871, the Ojibway/French mixed-bloods, or "half-breeds," of the Portage Band requested a reservation be set aside for them. While the request was accepted, the half-breeds were required "to move North, not nearer than 20 miles" where the current-day town of Westbourne is located. The new half-breed reserve was named Whitemud. In 1873, the reserve and its members were relocated again, straight north this time. In 1877, the residents of Whitemud were told to move again after the surveyor told them he made a mistake; this time, they were to head just one mile southeast, at the present-day location of Sandy Bay. The Ojibway/French mixed-blood reserve was thereafter renamed Sandy Bay.
 
On 21 July 1884, Sandy Bay had its very first elections. Francois Demarais won and became the first elected Chief, with Baptiste Spence and Wah-sah-hook winning for the first-ever councilor positions.

References

External links
 Sandy Bay Ojibway First Nation
 Map of Sandy Bay 5 at Statcan

Dakota Ojibway Tribal Council
First Nations in Central Manitoba
Anishinaabe peoples
Ojibwe governments
Sandy Bay First Nation